9641 Demazière, provisional designation , is a stony asteroid from the inner regions of the asteroid belt, approximately 3 kilometers in diameter. It was discovered by Belgian astronomer Eric Elst at ESO's La Silla Observatory site in northern Chile on 12 August 1994. The asteroid was named for Belgian scientist Martine De Mazière.

Orbit and classification 

Demazière orbits the Sun in the inner main-belt at a distance of 2.1–2.8 AU once every 3 years and 10 months (1,403 days). Its orbit has an eccentricity of 0.13 and an inclination of 5° with respect to the ecliptic. A first precovery was obtained by the Steward Observatory at Kitt Peak in 1991, extending the body's observation arc by 3 years prior to its official discovery observation at La Silla.

Physical characteristics 

Demazière has been characterized as a V-type asteroid by Pan-STARRS photometric survey.

Lightcurves 

In November 2010, a rotational lightcurve of Demazière was obtained from photometric observations taken at the Palomar Transient Factory in California. It gave a rotation period of  hours with a brightness amplitude of 0.9 magnitude.

Diameter and albedo 

The Collaborative Asteroid Lightcurve Link assumes a standard albedo for stony asteroids of 0.20 and calculates a diameter of 2.7 kilometers with an absolute magnitude of 15.2.

Naming 

This minor planet was named in honor of Belgian scientist Martine De Mazière (born 1960), director-general at the Belgian Institute for Space Aeronomy as of 2016. Working with the optical scanning of Earth's atmosphere, her research focuses on the effect of aerosols in the atmosphere's composition. Mazière has also assessed the post-Pinatubo NO2 reduction and recovery, using spectroscopic observations in the UV and visible made at the Swiss Sphinx Observatory (Jungfraujoch) over a period of 10 years.

The approved naming citation was published by the Minor Planet Center on 4 May 1999.

References

External links 
 Martine De Mazière, Belgian Institute for Space Space Aeronomy, Brussels, Belgium (at ResearchGate)
 BIRA-IASB, Royal Belgian Institute for Space Aeronomy
 Asteroid Lightcurve Database (LCDB), query form (info )
 Dictionary of Minor Planet Names, Google books
 Asteroids and comets rotation curves, CdR – Observatoire de Genève, Raoul Behrend
 Discovery Circumstances: Numbered Minor Planets (5001)-(10000) – Minor Planet Center
 
 

009641
Discoveries by Eric Walter Elst
Named minor planets
19940812